Arabic Braille is the braille alphabet for the Arabic language. It descends from a braille alphabet brought to Egypt by an English missionary prior to 1878, so the letter assignments generally correspond to English Braille and to the same romanization as in other braille systems, like Greek and Russian. However, there were once multiple standards, some of which (such as Algerian Braille) were unrelated to Coptic Braille. A unified Arabic Braille was adopted in the 1950s as part of the move toward international braille, and it is the standard throughout the Arab world. Other Arabic-based alphabets have braille systems similar to Arabic Braille, such as Urdu and Persian Braille, but differ in some letter and diacritic assignments.

Arabic Braille is read from left to right, following the international convention. Numbers are also left to right, as in printed Arabic.

Arabic Braille chart
Arabic Braille includes numerous abbreviations, some marked by dot 4 or dot 5 (the comma), which are not described here.  A conference in Saudi Arabia in 2002 set up a unified braille standard for Arabic, but as of 2013 not all countries had signed up; those not adopting the standard include some Arab countries but also non-Arab Muslim countries such as Iran, Malaysia, and Indonesia.

Letters
Although short-vowel letters are not diacritics in Arabic Braille, they are optional and generally omitted, just as in print Arabic.

 ⟨⟩ comes before the consonant;  ⟨⟩ and the vowels after.

Punctuation and formatting
There are some differences in quotation marks, brackets, and underlining between traditional and unified Arabic braille conventions.

Common punctuation

Legacy punctuation

Unified Arabic punctuation

See also

 Moon type is a simplification of the Latin alphabet for embossing. An adaptation for Arabic-reading blind people has been proposed.

External links 
 Arabic to Braille Translator

References 

 
French-ordered braille alphabets